Manuel Manligas Bonoan is a Filipino businessman and engineer who was the president and chief executive officer of SMC Tollways. He is currently the Secretary of the Department of Public Works and Highways since June 30, 2022.

Career

Government
Bonoan has been involved in the Department of Public Works and Highways (DPWH) serving as assistant secretary during the administration of President Fidel V. Ramos and as undersecretary during the tenures of Presidents Joseph Estrada and Gloria Macapagal Arroyo. During Arroyo's administration, he was also the acting secretary of the DPWH from February to July 2007.

President-elect Bongbong Marcos selected Bonoan to lead the DPWH once Marcos assumes the presidency. He will succeed acting secretary Roger Mercado, who in turn succeeded Mark Villar who resigned for a successful senatorial campaign in the 2022 elections. He pledged for the continuation of unfinished projects under the Build! Build! Build! program of President Rodrigo Duterte and would pursue projects that would help the agriculture and tourism industries.

Business
Bonoan is the president and chief executive officer of SMC Tollways, the operator of Skyway, NAIA Expressway, South Luzon Expressway, the Southern Tagalog Arterial Road, and Tarlac–Pangasinan–La Union Expressway tollways. He was also president of the Skyway O&M Corporation, the operator of Skyway and NAIA Expressway led by Ramon Ang, prior to his involvement with SMC Tollways.

References

Filipino engineers
Filipino business executives
Arroyo administration cabinet members
Bongbong Marcos administration cabinet members
Secretaries of Public Works and Highways of the Philippines
Living people
Ilocano people
Year of birth missing (living people)